Høgni is a Faroese male given name, originating from Old Norse Hǫgni, meaning "protector" or "patron", and is a variant of Hagen. The name may refer to:

Høgni Hoydal (born 1966), Faroese politician
Høgni Lisberg (born 1982), Faroese musician 
Høgni Madsen (born 1985), Faroese footballer 
Høgni Mohr (born 1968), Faroese writer
Høgni Reistrup (born 1984), Faroese singer and musician 
Høgni Zachariasen (born 1982), Faroese footballer

References

Faroese masculine given names